David Matthew Hodne (born November 30, 1969) is a United States Army major general who has served as the commanding general of the 4th Infantry Division and Fort Carson since August 19, 2021. He previously served as the 59th commandant of the United States Army Infantry School from August 3, 2018, to August 6, 2021, and chief of infantry of the Army from July 16, 2018, to August 6, 2021. He was dual-hatted as Director of the Soldier Lethality Cross-Functional Team.

Early life
Hodne and his twin brother Daniel are the sons of Thomas and Ruth Hodne. Their father is a disabled military veteran. Daniel Hodne is also a 1991 West Point graduate who retired from the army as a colonel in 2017. graduated from Clarkstown High School South in 1987.

Military career

Hodne then attended the United States Military Academy, graduating in 1991 with a Bachelor of Science degree in aerospace engineering. Hodne later earned a Master of Arts in military studies in unconventional warfare from the American Military University. After completing the Ranger Indoctrination Program (RIP) known today as the Ranger Assessment and Selection Program or "RASP", Hodne was assigned to the 2nd Ranger Battalion, 75th Ranger Regiment in which he served multiple tours of duty to both Iraq and Afghanistan in support of the Gulf War and the War on Terror. Hodne, then a Major, was the officer in charge of operations and planning of the mission during which Pat Tillman was killed.[18]

Hodne has commanded the United States Army Infantry School and is currently the commanding general of the 4th Infantry Division in Fort Carson, Colorado, assuming command on August 19, 2021.

Personal life
Hodne is married to fellow 1991 West Point graduate Shelley Ann Berry who retired from the army as a colonel in 2012.

Awards and decorations
Hodne was awarded the following decorations during his military career:

References

1969 births
Living people
Place of birth missing (living people)
United States Military Academy alumni
Military personnel from New York (state)
United States Army Rangers
United States Army Command and General Staff College alumni
Georgetown University alumni
Recipients of the Legion of Merit
United States Army generals
Recipients of the Defense Superior Service Medal